Unkulunkulu (/uɲɠulun'ɠulu/), often formatted as uNkulunkulu, is a mythical ancestor, mythical predecessor group, or Supreme Creator in the language of the Zulu people. Originally a "first ancestor" figure, Unkulunkulu morphed into a creator god figure with the spread of Christianity.

Pre-Christian Role 
In general usage, before the spread of Christianity, Unkulunkulu was a general term referring to an "old-old one," or an ancestor. In this situation, these Onkulunkulu (the plural form) could be male or female, and most tribes and families had one, regarding them with great respect. Unkulunkulu also existed in a broader role as a sole, ancient figure; this figure being male, he played a role in broader Zulu mythology as the ancestor of humanity, but was given little attention.

Unkulunkulu was also thought of as a group of multiple ancestral people distinct from humans that came after who had intercourse to give birth to the Zulu and humanity from the time these stories were told. The Zulu storytellers from when these ancestor stories were being told thought of humans as living in tribes, so all human groups the Unkulunkulu gave birth to were thought to have formed into tribes afterwards.

Post-Christian Role 
With the spread of Christianity in the mid-1800s, various Zulu populations began referring to Unkulunkulu in a different light. This new form of Unkulunkulu was a creator deity rather than an ancestor archetype. This form closely resembles the Christian God and is referred to in the same context. Other names for this being used in similar cultures include uMdali (meaning "Creator") and uMvelinqandi (meaning "Before everything"; analogous to Umvelinqangi in the isiXhosa language).

While he still often represented the first man, he also began to represent a creator/originator of humanity and all creation. This version of Unkulunkulu originated from reeds; he then created humans and livestock from the same reeds, and created everything else afterwards from no original source. After he created all, Unkulunkulu is said to have forgotten his creations and abandoned them, and there are no myths of him beyond this point of creation.

Notes

Zulu gods
Creator gods
Names of God in African traditional religions